Kakavia may refer to:
 Kakavia (soup), a Greek fish stew
 Kakavia (border crossing), a border crossing between Albania and Greece
 Kakavijë Kakavia, a village in southern Albania